Actinotia polyodon, the purple cloud, is a moth of the family Noctuidae. It is found in much of the Palearctic realm, from Europe to Russia and Japan.

A. polyodon Cl. (= perspicillaris L.) (15 d). Forewing bone-colour suffused with olive brown along  costa and inner margin and interrupted along termen; the reniform stigma also placed on an olive brown cloud: costa and space between veins 2 and 4 tinged with purplish pink; a black streak from base in submedian fold and a double one from inner margin near base; reniform stigma large, pale olive with linear centre and outline creamy white; veins towards margin dark, forming centre of wedgeshaped marks, 3, 4 and 7, 8 broadly edged with ground colour and cutting the dark fringe; outer line marked by dark dots on veins: hindwing bone-colour with broad brownish margin and blackish veins. - Larva red-brown, dotted with black; a subdorsal row of oblique brown marks; dorsal and spiracular lines yellow; head brown.

The wingspan is 31–36 mm.

Biology
Adults are on wing from May to August in two generations. At times there is a partial third generation from September to October.

The larvae feed on perforate St John's-wort (Hypericum perforatum) and liquorice milkvetch (Astragalus glycyphyllos).

References

External links 
 Purple cloud on UKmoths
 Fauna Europaea
 Lepidoptera of Belgium
Lepiforum.de

Hadeninae
Moths described in 1759
Palearctic Lepidoptera
Taxa named by Carl Alexander Clerck